The secretary-general of the United Nations (UNSG or SG) is the chief administrative officer of the United Nations and head of the United Nations Secretariat, one of the six principal organs of the United Nations.

The role of the secretary-general and of the secretariat is laid out by Chapter XV (Articles 97 to 101) of the United Nations Charter. However, the office's qualifications, selection process and tenure are open to interpretation; they have been established by custom.

Selection and term of office

The secretary-general is appointed by the General Assembly upon the recommendation of the Security Council. As the recommendation must come from the Security Council, any of the five permanent members of the council can veto a nomination. Most secretaries-general are compromise candidates from middle powers and have little prior fame.

Unofficial qualifications for the job have been set by precedent in previous selections. The appointee may not be a citizen of any of the Security Council's five permanent members. The General Assembly resolution 51/241 in 1997 stated that, in the appointment of "the best candidate", due regard should be given to regional (continental) rotation of the appointee's national origin and to gender equality, although no woman has yet served as secretary-general. All appointees to date have been career diplomats.
\

The length of the term is discretionary, but all secretaries-general since 1971 have been appointed to five-year terms. Every secretary-general since 1961 has been re-selected for a second term, with the exception of Boutros Boutros-Ghali, who was vetoed by the United States in the 1996 selection. There is a term limit of two full terms, established when China, in the 1981 selection, cast a record 16 vetoes against a third term for Kurt Waldheim. No secretary-general since 1981 has attempted to secure a third term.

The selection process is opaque and is often compared to a papal conclave. Since 1981, the Security Council has voted in secret in a series of straw polls; it then submits the winning candidate to the General Assembly for ratification. No candidate has ever been rejected by the General Assembly, and only once, in 1950, has a candidate been voted upon despite a UNSC veto.

In 2016, the General Assembly and the Security Council sought nominations and conducted public debates for the first time. However, the Security Council voted in private and followed the same process as previous selections, leading the president of the General Assembly to complain that it "does not live up to the expectations of the membership and the new standard of openness and transparency".

Powers and duties
The role of the secretary-general is described as combining the functions and responsibilities of an advocate, diplomat, civil servant, and chief executive officer. The UN Charter designates the secretary-general as the "chief administrative officer" of the UN and allows them to perform "such other functions as are entrusted" by other United Nations organs. The Charter also empowers the secretary-general to inform the Security Council of "any matter which in his opinion may threaten the maintenance of international peace and security". These provisions have been interpreted as providing broad leeway for officeholders to serve a variety of roles as suited to their preferences, skill set, or circumstances.

The secretary-general's routine duties include overseeing the activities and duties of the secretariat; attending sessions with United Nations bodies; consulting with world leaders, government officials, and other stakeholders; and travelling the world to engage with global constituents and bring attention to certain international issues. The secretary-general publishes an annual report on the work of the UN, which includes an assessment of its activities and an outline future priorities. The secretary-general is also the chairman of the United Nations System Chief Executives Board for Coordination (CEB), a body composed of the heads of all UN funds, programmes and specialized agencies, which meets twice a year to discuss substantive and management issues facing the United Nations System.

Many of the secretary-general's powers are informal and left open to individual interpretation; some appointees have opted for more activist roles, while others have been more technocratic or administrative. The secretary-general is often reliant upon the use of their "good offices", described as "steps taken publicly and in private, drawing upon his independence, impartiality and integrity, to prevent international disputes from arising, escalating or spreading". Consequently, observers have variably described the office as the "world's most visible bully pulpit" or as the "world's moderator". Examples include Dag Hammarskjöld's promotion of an armistice between the warring parties of Arab-Israel conflict, Javier Perez de Cuellar's negotiation of a ceasefire in the Iran-Iraq War, and U Thant's role in deescalating the Cuban Missile Crisis.

Residence
The official residence of the secretary-general is a townhouse at 3 Sutton Place, Manhattan, in New York City, United States. The townhouse was built for Anne Morgan in 1921 and donated to the United Nations in 1972.

List of secretaries-general

Statistics

By regional group

See also 

 Under-Secretary-General of the United Nations

Further reading
 Jodok Troy (2020) "The United Nations Secretary-General as an International Civil Servant." The International History Review

References

External links
 UN Secretary-General webpage
 How is the Secretary-General appointed?
 Global Policy Forum – UN Secretary-General
 Report on the process of appointing a new Secretary-General
 Who Will be the Next Secretary-General? (website on the 2006 campaigns)

Secretaries-general
Secretary-general
United Nations posts
United Nations Secretariat